Mayumi Ohkutsu (born July 12, 1968 in Obihiro, Hokkaido, Japan as Mayumi Seguchi; also known as Mayumi Seguchi-Ohkutsu, Mayumi Seguchi-Okutsu) is a Japanese curler, a five-time  (1991, 1993, 1995, 1996, 1997) and a six-time Japan women's champion (1991, 1992, 1993, 1996, 1997, 1998).

She played for Japan at the 1998 Winter Olympics, where the Japanese team finished in fifth place. Also, she competed at the 1992 Winter Olympics, where curling was a demonstration sport and the Japanese team finished in eighth place.

Teams

Women's

Mixed

References

External links

Nagano 1998 - Official Report Vol. 3 (web archive; "Curling" chapter starts at page 236)
Mayumi Ohkutsu - Curling - Nihon Olympic Iinkai (Japanese Olympic Committee - JOC)

Living people
1968 births
Sportspeople from Hokkaido
Japanese female curlers
Pacific-Asian curling champions
Japanese curling champions
Curlers at the 1992 Winter Olympics
Curlers at the 1998 Winter Olympics
Olympic curlers of Japan